Dieter Elsneg (born 4 February 1990) is an Austrian professional football official and a former player who played as a midfielder or forward. Now after one year of vocational adjustment he became the new sporting director of Grazer AK.

References

External links
 

Living people
1990 births
Association football midfielders
Association football forwards
Austrian footballers
Austrian Football Bundesliga players
2. Liga (Austria) players
Serie B players
Grazer AK players
Kapfenberger SV players
Frosinone Calcio players
U.C. Sampdoria players
SV Grödig players
SV Ried players
Austrian expatriate footballers
Austrian expatriate sportspeople in Italy
Expatriate footballers in Italy
Austrian football managers
Grazer AK managers